Diana DiZoglio (born June 5, 1983) is an American politician who is the current Massachusetts State Auditor. A member of the Democratic Party, DiZoglio had previously represented the 1st Essex District in the Massachusetts Senate from 2019 to 2023. The district included her home city of Methuen as well as Newburyport, Haverhill, Merrimac, Amesbury, Salisbury, and four of eight precincts in North Andover.

DiZoglio also previously represented the 14th Essex district, which included portions of North Andover, Methuen, Lawrence and Haverhill, in the Massachusetts House of Representatives from 2013 until 2019. In June 2021, DiZoglio announced her run for Massachusetts State Auditor and won the 2022 election in November.

Early life and career

DiZoglio was born in Methuen, Massachusetts, graduating from Methuen High School in 2002. She attended Wellesley College, graduating with a Bachelor's of Arts in Psychology and Spanish. DiZoglio also attended Middlesex Community College, graduating with an associate degree in Psychology. Prior to being elected to the Massachusetts House of Representatives, DiZoglio worked as chief-of-staff to Edward A. Kelly, president of the Professional Fire Fighters of Massachusetts (PFFM). She also served as a legislative aide in the Massachusetts House of Representatives, worked for multiple non-profit organizations and was a small business owner.

Political career 

DiZoglio was elected to the Massachusetts House of Representatives in 2012, running a successful primary challenge to incumbent State Representative David M. Torrisi. In the general election, DiZoglio defeated Republican nominee Karin Rhoton.

In 2014, DiZoglio sought a second term. She faced two Democratic primary opponents, Phil DeCologero and Oscar Camargo, who she defeated. She won the general election over Republican nominee Rosemary Smedile.

In 2016, DiZoglio defeated Democratic primary opponent Phyllis Jones by almost a nine to one margin. She won a third term in the general election unopposed.

She had filed legislation aimed at curbing opioid prescriptions and attempted to establish a task force in Massachusetts on protecting elderly and elderly persons residing in public housing.

DiZoglio worked with the Lawrence legislative delegation to secure $145,000 for STEM (science, technology, engineering and math) learning at Greater Lawrence Technical School.

In March 2018 DiZoglio announced her candidacy for the 1st Essex District State Senate after incumbent State Senator Kathleen O'Connor Ives announced her decision to not seek reelection. She won the Democratic primary unopposed. On November 6, 2018, she defeated Republican Alexandar Leighton Williams with 66.3% of the vote.

She was the chair of the Joint Committee on Community Development and Small Businesses.

See also
 2019–2020 Massachusetts legislature
 2021–2022 Massachusetts legislature

References

External links

State Auditor website
Campaign website

|-

|-

|-

 

1983 births
21st-century American politicians
21st-century American women politicians
Living people
Democratic Party members of the Massachusetts House of Representatives
Middlesex Community College (Massachusetts) alumni
People from Methuen, Massachusetts
State auditors of Massachusetts
Wellesley College alumni
Women state legislators in Massachusetts